The ITF Year is the official yearbook of the International Tennis Federation (ITF). It replaced World of Tennis, edited by John Barrett as the ITF's official tennis annual. Its first edition, The ITF Year 2001, described the activities of the ITF in 2001 but was published in  January 2002. All subsequent editions have also  detailed events in the year following the date in the title, and have been published in the January of the following year, usually around the time of the Australian Open. The book was edited by Joanne Sirman in the 2001 and 2002 editions, Mitzi Ingram Evans from 2003 until 2012, and Jamie Renton from 2013 until 2016. The yearbook was discontinued in 2017.

The front covers of the books depict slightly blurred images of a tennis player or doubles team.

Players who have appeared on the cover
2001: Lleyton Hewitt
2002: Amélie Mauresmo
2003: Yevgeny Kafelnikov
2004: Anastasia Myskina
2005: Roger Federer
2006: Yan Zi and Zheng Jie
2007: Filippo Volandri
2008: Rafael Nadal
2009: 
2010: Esther Vergeer
2011: Novak Djokovic 
2012: Serena Williams
2013: Andy Murray
2014:
2015: Serena Williams
2016: Andy Murray

References
 Overview of The ITF Year, ITF website

Tennis mass media